Bewell's Cross is a lost monument which marked the boundary of the county of Bristol when this was created in 1373. It stood in or close to the Gallows Field at the top of St Michael's Hill, the former principal road from Bristol to Wales via the Severn ferry at Aust. It was removed in or before the 19th century, and a stone claimed to be taken from its pedestal is built into the wall of Cotham Church, marked by a plaque.

It appears to have taken its name from a spring a short way to the north-west whose name appears to be Old English for 'bee well'. But there was a Bristolian called Elias or Elys recorded in about 1270 with the surname Beowolf. It is just possible that Beowolf is a punning alteration of the name of the spring, although Beowulf is known as a rare surname elsewhere.

Bewell's Cross may have been historically confused with Bewys Cross in Kingsweston, also now within the boundaries of the city of Bristol.

References

External links
About Bristol Website

Monuments and memorials in Bristol
Archaeological sites in Bristol